"The Ex" is a song by Canadian rock group Billy Talent. It was released in December 2003 as the second single from their debut self-titled album.

Music video
The video for "The Ex," directed by Shawn Maher and Billy Talent, features the band playing in a small, dimly lit room with a cheering crowd in front of the stage. Some of the footage from "The Ex" was recorded at The Capital Music Hall in Ottawa, Ontario amongst other places.

Track listing
UK 7" Single
 The Ex - 2:40
 Try Honesty (acoustic) - 4:13

Chart performance

References

Billy Talent songs
2004 singles
Songs written by Ian D'Sa
Songs written by Benjamin Kowalewicz
Songs written by Jonathan Gallant
Songs written by Aaron Solowoniuk
Song recordings produced by Gavin Brown (musician)
2002 songs
Atlantic Records singles